Agenorides is a patronymic of Agenor, designating a descendant of any one of the ancient Greeks who was named Agenor, but usually used to describe only the descendants of Agenor, such as Cadmus, Phineus, and Perseus.

Argive genealogy in Greek mythology

References

 
Patronymics from Greek mythology